Bethel Christian School may refer to:

In the United States:
Bethel Christian School (California)
Bethel Christian School (Jefferson Davis Parish, Louisiana)
Bethel Christian School (Ruston, Louisiana)
Bethel Christian Academy (New York)
Bethel Christian School (Pennsylvania)

In Australia:
Bethel Christian School (Albany, Western Australia)

In New Zealand:
Bethel Christian School (New Zealand)

See also
 Bethel High School (disambiguation)
Bethel School (disambiguation)
Bethel (disambiguation)